Abdel Hamid Khamis (born 5 August 1944) is an Egyptian long-distance runner. He competed in the men's 10,000 metres at the 1972 Summer Olympics.

References

1944 births
Living people
Athletes (track and field) at the 1972 Summer Olympics
Egyptian male long-distance runners
Olympic athletes of Egypt
Place of birth missing (living people)